Sergio Gustavo Suárez Arteaga (born 6 January 1987) is a Spanish professional footballer who plays for Thai club Port F.C. as an attacking midfielder.

Club career
Born in Las Palmas, Canary Islands, Suárez came through local UD Las Palmas' youth system, making his senior debut with neighbouring Castillo CF whilst on loan. Upon his return, he then spent one full season with the B team, in Tercera División. On 14 November 2007 he made his first official appearance for the main squad, starting and scoring from a penalty kick in a 2–4 home loss to Villarreal CF in the Copa del Rey.

Over the course of the following six campaigns, with the club always in Segunda División, Suárez was regularly played, his first game in the competition taking place on 8 December 2007 as he came on as a 60th-minute substitute in a 1–0 home win against SD Eibar. On 15 May 2011, he was one of three players on target in a 5–3 victory at FC Barcelona B which all but certified the team's permanence.

Suárez was loaned to fellow league side CD Mirandés midway through 2012–13 and, when he returned to Las Palmas for the following season, was not even given a jersey number. He went on to spend several years in the Thai Premier League, starting out with Police United FC.

Personal life
Suárez's twin brother, Francisco, was also a footballer and a midfielder, and both played mostly for Las Palmas during their careers.

Honours
Port
Thai FA Cup: 2019

Individual
Thai League 1 Best XI: 2020–21

References

External links

1987 births
Living people
Spanish twins
Footballers from Las Palmas
Twin sportspeople
Spanish footballers
Association football midfielders
Segunda División players
Segunda División B players
Tercera División players
UD Las Palmas Atlético players
UD Las Palmas players
CD Mirandés footballers
Sergio Suarez
Sergio Suarez
Sergio Suarez
Sergio Suarez
Sergio Suarez
Spanish expatriate footballers
Expatriate footballers in Thailand
Spanish expatriate sportspeople in Thailand